Nikolai Bibikov (9 August 1842 – 21 February 1923) was a general in the Imperial Russian Army.

Bibikov was the son of Major General Valerian Aleksandrovich Bibikov. After graduating from the Nicholas Cavalry School he served in Lancer Guard regiment. In 1888–1890 he was ADC to the commander of the Warsaw military district Joseph Gurko. 

From 1892 to 1906 he was the President of Warsaw. In 1906 he stepped down from the post after being promoted to the rank of general.

References 

Imperial Russian Army generals
Mayors of Warsaw
Government officials of Congress Poland
Recipients of the Order of the White Eagle (Russia)
Recipients of the Order of Saint Stanislaus (Russian)
1842 births
1923 deaths
19th-century military personnel from the Russian Empire
White Russian emigrants to Czechoslovakia
And also he is a co worker in the Media Markt in the German city Wetzlar